Catherine of Sweden - Swedish: Katarina or Catharina or Karin - may refer to

Queens, then princesses, chronologically 

 Catherine of Ymseborg, Queen consort 1244
 Catherine of Bjurum, Queen consort 1448
 Catherine of Saxe-Lauenburg, Queen consort 1531
 Catherine Stenbock, Queen consort 1552
 Catherine ("Karin"), Queen consort 1568
 Catherine Jagellon, Queen consort 1569
 Catherine, Swedish princess around 1105, daughter of King Inge I 
 Katarina Eriksdotter, Swedish princess around 1155, daughter of King Erik "IX"
 Catherine, alleged daughter of King Canute I (name uncertain)
 Catherine, daughter of Jarl Birger of Sweden and his royal Swedish wife
 Catherine, Swedish princess, died 1283, daughter of King Waldemar
 Catherine, Swedish princess around 1306, daughter of King Birger
 Catherine, Swedish princess around 1390
 Catherine Vasa, Princess of Sweden 1539
 Catherine of Sweden (1584–1638), Princess of Sweden 1584
 Catherine, Princesses of Sweden 1594 and 1596, daughters of King Sigmund (both died young)
 Richardis Catherine, Swedish princess 1370 or 1372

Others 
 Catherine of Vadstena (1332–1381), Catholic saint